Saint-Maurice-Colombier is a commune in the Doubs department in the Bourgogne-Franche-Comté region in eastern France.

Geography

History
The commune was formed by merging the former communes of Saint-Maurice-Échelotte and Colombier-Châtelot in 1972.

Population

See also
 Colombier-Fontaine
 Communes of the Doubs department

References

External links

 Saint-Maurice-Colombier on the regional Web site 

Communes of Doubs